Larry Rubin (born August 31, 1974) is an American-Mexican businessman and political activist who has lived in both Mexico and the United States. He is currently the Managing Partner Latin America of a global American executive search firm. He is also the President and chairman of the Board of The American Society, represents the United States Republican Party, and writes as a columnist for Reforma, CNN Expansión and Forbes.

Early life and education
Rubin was born and raised in Mexico City. His father was from Cleveland, Ohio, and his mother is from Mexico. They both worked in the travel industry.

Born Larry David Rubin, he completed his studies through high school at the American School before obtaining a degree in business administration at Anahuac University. He has three doctorates "Honoris Causa".

While attending secondary school, Larry worked as a sales distributor for Amway Corporation and had a network of 1,000 distributors.

Business career
At age 18, he worked for US Airways, now American Airlines, as an airport check-in and baggage agent. He was responsible for the U.S. airline's opening of new routes to Cancún, Cozumel and Mexico City. In these destinations, he worked with local businesses and government to provide funding in order to promote passenger travel to the U.S. and Canada. He also established regular working meetings between U.S. airlines and the U.S. government in Mexico. Six years later, he became the general director of the Mexico branch.

Thereafter, Rubin became the General Director of Arizona-based direct sales company Forever Living Products in Mexico and afterwards as Partner for Chicago-based executive search firm Spencer Stuart.

Rubin is presently the Managing Partner Latin America for an executive search firm from the U.S. He has been in the executive search industry since 2012, placing officers in multinational companies. He has led American companies and organizations since 1996. He gives classes at one of the largest Mexican universities at Universidad Anahuac Mexico, where he promotes U.S. cultural heritage. Additionally he writes columns for CNN, Forbes and Reforma.

Political work

Mexico - US relations
From 1997 to 2008, Rubin served in different capacities and became the youngest CEO of the American Chamber of Commerce in Mexico. He left his job at U.S. Airways in 2005 to become the CEO of the American Chamber of Commerce of Mexico.

He also became Vice President of the Association of American Chambers of Commerce in Latin America. He lobbied the Mexican Congress for legislation in favor of US investment in Mexico. He has lobbied to support a bilateral relationship between the two countries through the Mexican Congress and Mexican Chamber of Deputies as he asserted cutting ties would hamper several U.S. industries. He also worked with the Mexican Federal Executive branch to lower the percentage on a new tax being proposed that would cost U.S. businesses more. He advised government against pressing double taxation on investments in Mexico. In a broader effort, Rubin lobbied Congress for approval of a tax reform benefiting business, and during the Forum on Fiscal Reform pointed out that both private sector and other actors involved had already reached agreements on tax reform that were ignored by Congress. He also promoted laws that would benefit U.S. businesses such as the changes to Mexican Social Security Institute. He worked together with Mexico's business organizations in the bilateral initiative Security and Prosperity Partnership of North America, where U.S. and Mexican businesses worked with both governments to enact regulations and laws that would benefit both. He was part of the delegation that helped pass the Mérida Initiative, a security cooperation agreement between the U.S. and the Mexican governments and the countries of Central America, with the declared aim of combating the threats of drug trafficking, transnational organized crime and money laundering. Rubin also lobbied for more security for U.S. businesses operating in Mexico, and for Congress and the Executive branch to work together to resolve this issue. Additionally he worked on regulations that he said would improve the flow of goods crossing both sides of the border, and improve delivery times of goods and services. He worked with U.S. Customs and Border Protection on the legislation's implementation. He signed an agreement with the Mexican government to modify regulations under the North American Free Trade Agreement (NAFTA). He has also protected U.S. business from unnecessary legal force in Mexico, such as when the Hotel María Isabel Sheraton was closed down and he worked with the Mexican authorities to reopen it. Additionally he has protected U.S. interests from harmful effects, such as the initiative to not buy and boycott American products.  He also opened dialogue with the three major parties and their candidates for President of Mexico and invited them to speak to the American investment community.

Rubin was awarded the Chamber's commerce award on six occasions for his contributions to the overall commercial relationship between Mexico and the US.

Presently, Rubin is the President and chairman of the Board of The American Society of Mexico, a non-profit organization that was founded in 1942, aims to promote U.S. traditions and heritage in Mexico. He also represents the US Republican Party in Mexico. Following Donald Trump's victory in the 2016 US Presidential Election, Rubin urged the Mexican government to strengthen diplomatic relations with the US during Donald Trump's presidency. In November he organized the largest apolitical election night in Mexico, with thousands of people in attendance and hundreds of news outlets present.

Since 2006, Rubin has advocated for reform of immigration in the United States.

In 2007, Rubin made public a survey of the Mexican public, which concluded that Mexico was one of the top nations for breach of copyright and trademark. He said that U.S. business was being hurt by the lack of enforcement in Mexico of intellectual property rights (IPR).

Energy reform 
As President of the American Society, Rubin argued for energy reform in Mexico, saying that oil prices would raise and thousands of jobs were threatened. Working together with a number of energy companies from the U.S. he was able to give specific recommendations to government. Energy reform was thus enacted in Mexico, benefiting many U.S. businesses.

U.S. Republican Party 
Rubin worked on the George W. Bush 2004 presidential campaign as president of the Republicans Abroad chapter of Mexico. He was asked to promote Bush to the American expatriates living in Mexico at the time.

Rubin continued working in other campaigns. He was part of the visit by candidate Sen. John McCain to Mexico in 2008 and promoted the vote for Gov. Mitt Romney in 2012.

Despite having opposed Trump's candidacy in 2016, Rubin was often brought up as a potential pick for the role of Ambassador of the United States to Mexico. Christopher Landau was later chosen for the position, replacing Roberta S. Jacobson.

References

1974 births
Living people
Mexican businesspeople
Republicans (United States)
Naturalized citizens of Mexico
Latino conservatism in the United States
American politicians of Mexican descent